Raja Jalal Hussain Maqpoon is a Pakistani politician who served as the 7th Governor of Gilgit-Baltistan from 2018 to 2022.

Political career
He ran for the seat of the Legislative Assembly of Gilgit Baltistan as a candidate of PTI from Constituency GBLA-7 in the 2015 Gilgit Baltistan Assembly election, but was unsuccessful. He came in second receiving 3,330 votes and losing the seat to Akbar Khan Taban.

He was appointed the governor of Gilgit-Baltistan by President Arif Alvi on the advice of Prime Minister Imran Khan after the resignation of Mir Ghazanfar Ali Khan. On 30 September 2018, he took the oath of office as Governor. On 11 April 2022, he resigned.

See also 
 List of current Pakistani governors

References 

1961 births
Living people
Balti people
Pakistani Muslims
Governors of Gilgit-Baltistan
Pakistan Tehreek-e-Insaf politicians
People from Skardu District